Crossocheilus reticulatus (silver flying fox) is a freshwater fish in the family Cyprinidae from Southeast Asia. It grows to  standard length.

Habitat 
Crossocheilus reticulatus lives in clear, flowing waters over a variety of substrates.

Distribution 
It is found in the Mekong River in Yunnan (China), Laos, Thailand, Cambodia, and Vietnam, and in the Chao Phraya River and Mae Klong River in Thailand.

Utilization 
Crossocheilus reticulatus is an important fishery species, both in subsistence and commercial fisheries, in the Mekong basin. It is also collected for aquarium fish trade.

References

Cyprinid fish of Asia
Fish of the Mekong Basin
Fish of Cambodia
Freshwater fish of China
Fish of Laos
Fish of Thailand
Fish of Vietnam
Fish described in 1934
Taxa named by Henry Weed Fowler
Crossocheilus